Frédéric Da Rocha (born 16 September 1974) is a French former professional footballer who played as a midfielder.

Career

Nantes 
From 1996 to 2009 he was a key player for Nantes, winning the Coupe de France in 1998–99 and 1999–2000, the national championship in 2000–01 and the Trophée des Champions in 1999 and 2001. He was an attacking midfielder and winger who was renowned for his technique. In his time with Nantes, Da Rocha made over 400 appearances for the club.

Boulogne and Carquefou 
In the summer of 2009, he joined newly promoted Ligue 1 side Boulogne. After one season with Boulogne, Da Rocha signed for Championnat de France Amateur club Carquefou. He finished his playing career at the end of the 2010–11 season.

References

1974 births
Living people
French footballers
Association football midfielders
FC Nantes players
US Boulogne players
USJA Carquefou players
Ligue 1 players
Ligue 2 players
Championnat National 2 players
Footballers from Nouvelle-Aquitaine

French people of Portuguese descent
Sportspeople from Gironde